

List
</onlyinclude>

References 

Victories, 05